Arnaud Kouyo (born 4 August 1984 in Abidjan) is a former professional footballer who played as a defender and spent most of his career in Italy.

Kouyo made his debut in Serie A for Lecce.

References

External links
 

1984 births
Living people
Footballers from Abidjan
Association football defenders
Ivorian footballers
Ivory Coast under-20 international footballers
Serie A players
Belgian Pro League players
Czech First League players
U.S. Lecce players
S.S. Juve Stabia players
FK Baník Most players
R.A.E.C. Mons players
Ivorian expatriate footballers
Expatriate footballers in Italy
Expatriate footballers in Belgium
Expatriate footballers in the Czech Republic